"Goodbye" is a power ballad by the American hard rock band Night Ranger. It was released in October 1985, as the third and last single from their album 7 Wishes. It was written by guitarist Jeff Watson and singer Jack Blades.

Reaching No. 17, the song is the last U.S. top 40 hit for the band to date. The music video for "Goodbye" was good rotation on MTV at end of that year.

Track listing

Single version 
7" Single 
 "Goodbye" - 4:20
 "Seven Wishes" - 4:52

Promo version 
 12" Single
 "Goodbye" - 4:20
 "Goodbye" (short version) - 3:52

Chart performance

References

1985 songs
Night Ranger songs
Songs written by Jack Blades
Hard rock ballads
1980s ballads